Anderson "Andy" Ekern (born July 26, 1961) is a former American football tight end. He played for the Indianapolis Colts in 1984.

References

1961 births
Living people
American football tight ends
Missouri Tigers football players
Indianapolis Colts players